Darren Smith may refer to:

Sports
Darren Smith (Australian rules footballer) (born 1965), Port Adelaide premiership player
Darren Smith (rugby league) (born 1968), Australian rugby league footballer
Darren Smith (cyclist) (1972–1992), killed in a road accident after competing at the Barcelona Olympics
Darren Smith (field hockey) (born 1973), New Zealand field hockey player
Darren Smith (footballer, born 1980), Scottish footballer for Arbroath FC
Darren Smith (footballer, born 1986), Scottish footballer for Ballingry Rovers FC
Darren Smith (footballer, born 1988), Scottish footballer for Stenhousemuir FC

Other
Darren Smith (actor) (born 1962), producer and star of Repo! The Genetic Opera
Darren Smith, drummer and singer with Canadian band Harem Scarem

See also
Darrin Smith (born 1970), American football linebacker